Stenus clavicornis is a species of water skater in the family of beetles known as Staphylinidae.

References

Further reading

External links

 

Steninae
Beetles described in 1763
Taxa named by Giovanni Antonio Scopoli